Ville Piispanen (born 4 December 1983) is a Finnish former professional boxer who competed from 2005 to 2015. He held the European Union super-lightweight title from 2010 to 2011, and challenged once for the European super-lightweight title in 2013.

Amateur career
Piispanen won a bronze medal in the bantamweight division at the 2002 Finnish national amateur championships. He followed this up with silver at lightweight in 2003 and bronze at light-welterweight in 2005.

Professional career
On 30 September 2005, Piispanen made his professional debut by winning a four-round unanimous decision against Arturs Jaskuls, who also debuted. Piispanen fought for his first regional title against European Union super-lightweight champion Giuseppe Lauri on 19 December 2008, but was stopped in six rounds. Two years later, on 18 July 2010, Piispanen fought again for the now-vacant title, stopping Emanuele de Prophetis in four rounds to become champion.

His first defence, on 27 November 2010, against Daniel Rasilla, ended in a split draw. Piispanen was not as fortunate in his second defence, on 3 June 2011, as he lost to Vittorio Oi via seventh-round unanimous technical decision. On 13 October 2012, Piispanen attempted to regain his title, now made vacant, against Lenny Daws. After twelve rounds, Piispanen lost a unanimous decision. A chance to win the full European light-welterweight title came on 21 December 2013, against Michele di Rocco, but Piispanen lost again via unanimous decision.

Professional boxing record

References

External links

Finnish male boxers
Light-welterweight boxers
1983 births
Sportspeople from Lahti
Living people